Asteridea pulverulenta (common name - common bristle daisy) is a species of flowering plant in the Asteraceae family, which is endemic to Western Australia, in the south-west. It was first described in 1839 by John Lindley.

Description
It is an annual herb, growing on sandy soils to heights of from 5 cm to 70 cm. Its white flowers may seen from October to January on coastal dunes and sandplains.

Lindley describes the plant as having a dusty indumentum ("undique pilis mollibus ramentaceis pulverulenta"), and uses the adjective, pulverulenta ("powdered, dusty"), as the epithet to describe this characteristic of the plant.

References

External links 
 Asteridea pulverulenta occurrence data from the Australasian Virtual Herbarium

pulverulenta
Endemic flora of Western Australia
Eudicots of Western Australia
Plants described in 1839
Taxa named by John Lindley